SS John Mitchell was a Liberty ship built in the United States during World War II. She was named after John Mitchell, an American labor leader and president of the United Mine Workers of America from 1898 to 1908.

Construction
John Mitchell was laid down on 28 July 1942, under a Maritime Commission (MARCOM) contract, MCE hull 311, by the Bethlehem-Fairfield Shipyard, Baltimore, Maryland; she was sponsored by Mrs. John Green, the wife of the president of IUMSWA), and was launched on 7 September 1942.

History
She was allocated to States Marine Corp., on 19 September 1942. On 11 June 1948, she was laid up in the National Defense Reserve Fleet, Beaumont, Texas. On 15 February 1967, she was sold for scrapping to Southern Scrap Material Co., for $45,000. She was removed from the fleet on 18 May 1967.

References

Bibliography

 
 
 
 

 

Liberty ships
Ships built in Baltimore
1942 ships
Beaumont Reserve Fleet